Robert Earl Dickinson (born 26 March 1940, Millersburg, Ohio) is an American meteorologist and geoscientist.

Dickinson studied chemistry and physics at Harvard University with a bachelor's degree completed in 1961. As a graduate student, he studied meteorology at Massachusetts Institute of Technology (MIT) with a master's degree in 1962 and Ph.D. in 1966. After being a researcher at MIT, he joined in 1968 the National Center for Atmospheric Research (NCAR) in Boulder, Colorado. There, he co-created the Roble–Dickinson–Ridley, the first general circulation model of the thermosphere; eventually, he became in 1975 head of the climate division and in 1981 Deputy Director of the Climate and Global Dynamics Division. In 1990 he became a professor at the University of Arizona, in 1999 professor at Georgia Institute of Technology (GT), and since 2008 professor at the University of Texas at Austin (UT).

He works on climate models and computer models of processes in the atmosphere including interactions with the biosphere, global climate change, the carbon cycle on land, remote sensing, and the disappearance of tropical rain forests. 

In 1996, he received the Vetlesen Prize and the Revelle Medal from the American Geophysical Union (AGU) and in 1997 the Rossby Award from the American Meteorological Society (AMS). He is a member of the National Academy of Sciences (NAS) (1988) and the American Association for the Advancement of Science (AAAS). In 2002, he was elected a member of the National Academy of Engineering for pioneering contributions to a wide range of topics in atmospheric dynamics and earth system modeling.

In 2006 he became a foreign member of the Chinese Academy of Sciences. From 2002 to 2004 he was president of the AGU He is a Fellow of the AMS, whose Clarence Leroy Meisinger Award he received in 1973. He is an honorary member of the European Geophysical Society (EGS) and the European Geosciences Union (EGU).

References

External links
UT homepage
Vetlesen Prize

American meteorologists
1940 births
Living people
Harvard University alumni
Massachusetts Institute of Technology School of Science alumni
University of Arizona faculty
Georgia Tech faculty
University of Texas at Austin faculty
Intergovernmental Panel on Climate Change lead authors
Members of the United States National Academy of Engineering
Members of the United States National Academy of Sciences
Foreign members of the Chinese Academy of Sciences
Carl-Gustaf Rossby Research Medal recipients
People from Millersburg, Ohio